Waxy flexibility is a psychomotor symptom of catatonia which leads to a decreased response to stimuli and a tendency to remain in an immobile posture. Attempts to reposition the patient are met by "slight, even resistance", and after being repositioned, the patient will typically remain in the new position. Waxy flexibility rarely occurs in cases of delirium. The presence of waxy flexibility along with at least two other catatonic symptoms such as stupor or negativism are enough to warrant a diagnosis of catatonia.

If one were to move the arm of someone with waxy flexibility, the patient would keep that arm where it had been positioned until moved again, as if positioning malleable wax. Further alteration of an individual's posture is similar to bending a candle. Although waxy flexibility has historically been linked to schizophrenia, there are also other disorders which it may be associated with, such as mood disorders with catatonic behaviour.

Electroconvulsive therapy is often used as a treatment for catatonia. A study has found that catatonic patients with waxy flexibility responded faster to electroconvulsive therapy than patients with other symptoms of catatonia.

See also
 Catalepsy

References

External links 

Schizophrenia
Symptoms and signs of mental disorders
Bipolar disorder